Donna Rubin (born October 5, 1959) is an American former professional tennis player. She represented the U.S. at the 1977 Maccabiah Games in Israel, winning a silver medal in doubles with Jodi Appelbaum-Steinbauer, and at the 1981 Maccabiah Games, she and Dana Gilbert won a gold medal in women's doubles. She played doubles at the French Open in 1984.

Biography
A New York native, Rubin played on the boys' team at Rye Neck High School. She was a member of the United States Junior Federation Cup side. 

She represented the U.S. at the 1977 Maccabiah Games in Israel, where she won a silver medal in doubles with Jodi Appelbaum-Steinbauer. She played collegiate tennis for Stanford University and won the deciding doubles match which secured the 1978 AIAW championships. In 1980 she was named an All-American. At the 1981 Maccabiah Games, she and Dana Gilbert won a gold medal in the women's doubles.

Rubin was active on the professional tour in the early 1980s. She qualified for the main draw of the 1981 U.S. Clay Court Championships and won her first round match over Kim Sands, before losing in the next round to the top-seed Andrea Jaeger. In 1984 she featured in the women's doubles main draw of the French Open with Mary-Ann Colville.

References

External links
 
 

1959 births
Living people
American female tennis players
Jewish tennis players
Stanford Cardinal women's tennis players
Tennis people from New York (state)
People from Rye, New York
Competitors at the 1977 Maccabiah Games
Competitors at the 1981 Maccabiah Games
Maccabiah Games gold medalists for the United States
Maccabiah Games silver medalists for the United States
Maccabiah Games medalists in tennis
Jewish American sportspeople